Statistics of L. League in the 1995 season. Prima Ham FC Kunoichi won the championship.

First stage

Second stage

League standings

League awards

Best player

Top scorers

Best eleven

Best young player

JLSL Challenge League

See also 
 Empress's Cup

External links 
  Nadeshiko League Official Site

Nadeshiko League seasons
L
Japan
Japan
1995 in Japanese women's sport